Local elections were held in Serbia (excluding  Kosovo) on 24 September 2000, concurrently with the first round of voting in the 2000 Yugoslavian general election and the 2000 Vojvodina provincial election. This was the fourth and final local electoral cycle to take place while Serbia was a member of the Federal Republic of Yugoslavia.

The 2000 Yugoslavian general election was a watershed event in Serbian politics, resulting in the downfall of Slobodan Milošević's administration. The local elections, while less important in their own right, were part of the same general transformative moment.

This was the final local electoral cycle in Serbia (to date) in which assembly delegates were elected in single-member constituencies; all subsequent cycles have been held under proportional representation. In a change from the previous cycle, delegates were elected by first-past-the-post voting rather than in run-off elections between the top two candidates. The method of election undoubtedly contributed to the lopsided results in some opposition strongholds, including the capital Belgrade.

The Democratic Opposition of Serbia (Demokratska opozicija Srbije, DOS), a broad and ideologically diverse coalition of parties opposed to the Milošević administration, won significant majority victories in Belgrade, Novi Sad, Niš, and other major cities. Candidates from the Democratic Party (Demokratska stranka, DS), one of the main parties in the coalition, claimed the mayoralties in several jurisdictions won by the DOS (although not in the City of Belgrade, where a series of representatives from other DOS parties held the mayor's office).

Results

Belgrade
Elections were held at the city level and in all of Belgrade's constituent municipalities. The Democratic Opposition of Serbia (DOS) won a landslide victory in the election for the City Assembly of Belgrade and equally strong victories in many of the city's constituent municipalities. The alliance won every seat in three municipalities and all seats but one in three others.

The only Belgrade municipality that the DOS did not win was Sopot, where the Socialist Party of Serbia–Yugoslav Left won a majority government, helped by the presence of an incumbent mayor who was personally popular in the community.

Other than Sopot, the only municipality in Belgrade where the DOS did not win the popular vote was Lazarevac. It may be noted that the Socialist Party–Yugoslav Left alliance ran a full slate of candidates in this jurisdiction, while the DOS refrained from fielding candidates in three divisions (presumably due to pre-election arrangements with other opposition candidates).

City of Belgrade
Results of the election for the City Assembly of Belgrade:

Milan St. Protić of New Serbia (one of the parties in the Democratic Opposition of Serbia coalition) was chosen as mayor after the election. He resigned from the position on 20 March 2001 and was initially replaced on an interim basis by Dragan Jočić of the Democratic Party of Serbia. On 1 June 2001, Jočić was in turn replaced by Radmila Hrustanović of the Civil Alliance of Serbia.

Municipalities of Belgrade

Barajevo
Results of the election for the Municipal Assembly of Barajevo:

Zoran Jevtić of the Democratic Opposition of Serbia was chosen as mayor after the election. He resigned on 9 February 2001 and was replaced on an interim basis by Miodrag Skoknić. After an extended period in which the municipal assembly was not convened, Dragoljub Stanić was named as the head of a provisional administration in November 2001. A new municipal election was held in 2002.

Čukarica
Results of the election for the Municipal Assembly of Čukarica:

Incumbent mayor Zoran Alimpić of the Democratic Party was confirmed for another term in office after the election.

Grocka
Results of the election for the Municipal Assembly of Grocka:

Vesna Ivić of the Democratic Party was chosen as mayor after the election. He was replaced by Milan Tanasković of the Democratic Party of Serbia on 28 June 2002; Tanasković was in turn replaced by Sava Starčević of the Serbian Renewal Movement on 8 December 2002. After a further period of political upheaval, Vladan Zarić of the Democratic Party became mayor on 15 April 2003.

Lazarevac
Results of the election for the Municipal Assembly of Lazarevac:

Ljiljana Zdravković of the Democratic Party became mayor of the municipality in 2001.

Mladenovac
Results of the election for the Municipal Assembly of Mladenovac:

Zoran Kostić of the Democratic Party was chosen as mayor after the election.

New Belgrade
Results of the election for the Municipal Assembly of New Belgrade:

Željko Ožegović of the Democratic Party was chosen as mayor after the election. Future parliamentarian Marko Đurišić, also of the Democratic Party, was elected for the municipality's seventeenth division.

Obrenovac
Results of the election for the Municipal Assembly of Obrenovac:

Petar Knezević of the Democratic Opposition of Serbia served as mayor after the election.

Palilula
Results of the election for the Municipal Assembly of Palilula:

Milan Marković of the Democratic Party was chosen as mayor after the election.

Rakovica
Results of the election for the Municipal Assembly of Rakovica:

Srboslav Zečević of the Democratic Opposition of Serbia was chosen as mayor after the election.

Savski Venac
Results of the election for the Municipal Assembly of Savski Venac:

Branislav Belić of the Democratic Party was chosen as mayor after the election.

Sopot
Results of the election for the Municipal Assembly of Sopot:

Incumbent mayor Živorad Milosavljević of the Socialist Party was confirmed for another term in office after the election.

Stari Grad
Results of the election for the Municipal Assembly of Stari Grad:

Mirjana Božidarević of the Democratic Party was chosen as mayor after the election. Nemanja Šarović ran unsuccessfully as the Radical Party's candidate in the municipality's tenth division.

Voždovac
Results of the election for the Municipal Assembly of Voždovac:

Stevan Radović of the Democratic Party was chosen as mayor after the election.

Vračar
Results of the election for the Municipal Assembly of Vračar:

Incumbent mayor Milena Milošević of the Democratic Party was confirmed for another term in office after the election.

Zemun
Results of the election for the Municipal Assembly of Zemun:

Vladan Janićijević of the Democratic Party became mayor after the election. Future parliamentarian Ljiljana Mihajlović ran unsuccessfully for the Radical Party in Zemun's fourth division.

Zvezdara
Results of the election for the Municipal Assembly of Zvezdara:

Peter Moravac of the Democratic Party served as mayor after the election.

Vojvodina

South Bačka District
Elections were held in all twelve municipalities of the South Bačka District. The Democratic Opposition of Serbia was successful in most areas, winning the Novi Sad municipal assembly in a landslide and participating on the winning side in at least seven of the eleven other municipalities in the district (sometimes in alliance with the Serbian Renewal Movement and other opposition candidates).

The Socialist Party of Serbia held its historical strongholds of Bačka Palanka and Beočin and also won a narrow victory in Titel (although it was not able to form a stable government in the last of these communities). The defeat of the Socialists in Vrbas, another of the party's historical strongholds, was considered an upset.

Independent candidates won the largest number of seats in Bački Petrovac, and independent candidate Pavel Zima was subsequently chosen as mayor of the municipality.

Novi Sad
Results of the election for the Municipal Assembly of Novi Sad:

Borislav Novaković of the Democratic Party was chosen as mayor after the election. Former mayor Milorad Mirčić of the Radical Party sought re-election to the assembly and, like all Radical Party candidates in this cycle, was defeated.

Bač
Results of the election for the Municipal Assembly of Bač:

Tomislav Bogunović of the Democratic Party was chosen as mayor after the election.

Bačka Palanka
Results of the election for the Municipal Assembly of Bačka Palanka:

Zvezdan Kisić of the Socialist Party served as mayor after the election.

Bački Petrovac
Results of the election for the Municipal Assembly of Bački Petrovac:

Independent delegate Pavel Zima served as mayor after the election.

Bečej
Results of the election for the Municipal Assembly of Bečej:

Zoran Stojšin of the Democratic Party became mayor after the election.

Beočin
Results of the election for the Municipal Assembly of Beočin:

Dimitrije Kovačević of the Socialist Party was chosen as mayor after the election.

Srbobran
Results of the election for the Municipal Assembly of Srbobran:

Branislav Pivnički, a representative of Democratic Opposition of Serbia and aligned candidates, served as mayor following the election.

Sremski Karlovci
Results of the election for the Municipal Assembly of Sremski Karlovci:

Đorđe Gačić of the Serbian Renewal Movement (one of the parties in the United Democratic Opposition) served as mayor after the election.

Temerin
Results of the election for the Municipal Assembly of Temerin:

Although the Socialist Party–Yugoslav Left alliance won a plurality victory, the sixteen opposition delegates were able to unite to form a new local government. Petar Novak of the Democratic Party of Serbia (one of the parties in the United Democratic Opposition alliance) was chosen as mayor after the election. He was succeeded by Ðuro Žiga of the same party in 2002.

Titel
Results of the election for the Municipal Assembly of Titel:

The local government formed after this election was not stable, and a new municipal election was held in November 2001. Milivoj Petrović of the Democratic Party was named as leader of the municipal council prior to the 2001 vote and was confirmed as mayor afterward.

Vrbas
Results of the election for the Municipal Assembly of Vrbas:

Rafail Ruskovski of the Democratic Party served as mayor after the election. Milan Stanimirović, also of the Democratic Party, succeeded him in 2002.

Žabalj
Results of the election for the Municipal Assembly of Žabalj:

The Serbian Renewal Movement participated in the Democratic Opposition of Serbia alliance in Žabalj. Vasa Zlokolica of the Serbian Renewal Movement was chosen as mayor after the election.

Central Serbia (excluding Belgrade)

Mačva District
The Socialist Party of Serbia won local elections in Mačva District.

Bogatić

Vladimirci

Nišava District
Local elections were held in the City of Niš, both of Niš's constituent municipalities, and the six other municipalities of the Nišava District.

The results showed a pronounced divide between the city, where the DOS won an overwhelming victory, and its periphery, where the SPS–JUL alliance won majority victories in every jurisdiction except one. (The exception was Svrljig, where the result was a tie and a member of the DOS ultimately won the mayor's office.)

The SPS subsequently lost its majority in Ražanj, and a temporary administration was appointed prior to a new election in 2002.

City of Niš
Results of the election for the City Assembly of Niš:

Incumbent mayor Zoran Živković of the Democratic Party was initially confirmed for another term in office when the city assembly convened in October 2000. Živković resigned the following month after being appointed to a ministerial position in the Federal Republic of Yugoslavia; his successor was Goran Ćirić, also a member of the Democratic Party.

Municipality of Niš
Results of the election for the Municipal Assembly of Niš:

Vladimir Domazet of the Democratic Party was chosen as mayor of the municipality after the election.

Niška Banja
Results of the election for the Municipal Assembly of Niška Banja:

Branislav Cvetković of the Democratic Party was chosen as mayor after the election.

Aleksinac
Results of the election for the Municipal Assembly of Aleksinac:

The local government proved unstable, and a new election was held in November 2001. Radoslav Pavković served as mayor after the latter election.

Doljevac
Results of the election for the Municipal Assembly of Doljevac:

Predrag Stanojević of the Socialist Party served as mayor after the election.

Gadžin Han
Results of the election for the Municipal Assembly of Gadžin Han:

Incumbent mayor Siniša Stamenković of the Socialist Party was confirmed for another term in office after the election.

Merošina
Results of the election for the Municipal Assembly of Merošina:

The Socialist Party remained in power after the election. Following a period of local upheaval, Socialist Party member Zoran Ristić was chosen as mayor on 13 January 2002.

Ražanj
Results of the election for the Municipal Assembly of Ražanj:

The Socialist Party won the election, but it fell from power on 3 December 2001, when sixteen assembly members resigned. The assembly was dissolved, Životije Popović of the Democratic Opposition of Serbia was appointed as president of a provisional council, and new elections were scheduled for 2002.

Svrljig
Results of the election for the Municipal Assembly of Svrljig:

The election resulted in a tie between the Socialists and the combined forces of the opposition. When the assembly convened Tihomir Vidanović of the Democratic Party was chosen as mayor over SPS candidate Saša Golubović. Vidanović resigned in 2004, and Golubović (who had since left the SPS to join G17 Plus) was chosen as his successor.

Šumadija District
Elections were held in all seven municipalities of the Šumadija District. The DOS won a somewhat unexpected majority victory in Kragujevac and also won majorities in Aranđelovac, Lapovo, and Topola. A local opposition alliance including the DOS won in Knić, and in Rača the DOS and SPO ran a combined campaign and won a landslide majority.

The SPS–JUL alliance won a narrow majority in Batočina and an incumbent mayor from the Yugoslav Left initially remained in power, but he was removed from office in 2001. The Democratic Party of Serbia won a new election in the municipality later in the same year.

Kragujevac
Results of the election for the City Assembly of Kragujevac:

In Kragujevac, the local membership of the Democratic Party was divided between members who favoured membership in the DOS and those who wanted to align with the "Together for Kragujevac" citizens' group (led by incumbent mayor Veroljub Stevanović, a member of the Serbian Renewal Movement). The DS board was dissolved in the middle of the campaign, and many of its members joined Stevanović's campaign.

The DOS's majority victory in the city was somewhat unexpected. Vlatko Rajković, a Democratic Party member who remained aligned with the DOS, was chosen as mayor after the election.

Aranđelovac
Results of the election for the Municipal Assembly of Aranđelovac:

Radmilo Milošević of the Democratic Party of Serbia was chosen as mayor after the election.

Batočina
Results of the election for the Municipal Assembly of Batočina:

Incumbent mayor Slobodan Živulović of the Yugoslav Left was confirmed for a new term in office after the election. An international warrant was later issued for his arrest, and he went on the run. The Serbian government introduced an administration led by Radiša Milošević of the Democratic Party, which remained in power for nine months. A new election was held in November 2001, after which time Miodrag Nikolić of the Democratic Party of Serbia served as mayor.

Knić
Results of the election for the Municipal Assembly of Knić:

Vojin Maksimović of the United Opposition of Knić served as mayor after the election.

Lapovo
Results of the election for the Municipal Assembly of Lapovo:

Miloš Zdravković of the Democratic Opposition of Serbia served as mayor after the election.

Rača
Results of the election for the Municipal Assembly of Rača:

The Serbian Renewal Movement and Democratic Opposition of Serbia ran a coordinated campaign in Rača, with each group withholding candidates in certain electoral divisions to prevent vote-splitting. Slađan Radovanović of the Serbian Renewal Movement was chosen as mayor after the election.

Topola
Results of the election for the Municipal Assembly of Topola:

Miomir Tadić of New Serbia was chosen as mayor after the election.

References

Elections in Serbia
Local elections in Serbia
Serbia
September 2000 events in Europe